Park Eun-ji (born March 20, 1983) is a South Korean television personality, actress and former weather presenter. She was a cast member in the reality dating show Match Made In Heaven (2015) & game show The Genius: Rules of the Game. (2013)  She was also a weather presenter in the MBC Newsdesk.

Television appearances
2020: King of Mask Singer (MBC), contestant as "Surfer" (episode 267)

References

External links

1984 births
IHQ (company) artists
Living people
South Korean television personalities
Weather presenters
South Korean television actresses
Konkuk University alumni